Keith Norman Roney (born February 11, 1948) is a Canadian international lawn bowler.

Bowls career
He was born in Regina, Saskatchewan, he grew up in Bulyea, Saskatchewan and first began bowling in 1979. He has won 27 medals at the Canadian Championships and was inducted into the Saskatchewan Sports Hall of Fame.

He won four medals at the Asia Pacific Bowls Championships including a gold medal in the 2003 pairs, in Brisbane, Australia.

Roney won the gold medal in the pairs with Ryan Bester at the 2004 World Outdoor Bowls Championship in Ayr.

Personal life
He is married to fellow international bowler Jean Roney.

References

1948 births
Living people
Bowls World Champions
Canadian male bowls players
Sportspeople from Regina, Saskatchewan